The 2016–17 season was Maribor's 57th season of football, and their 26th consecutive season in the Slovenian PrvaLiga, Slovenian top division, since the league establishment in 1991 with Maribor as one of the league's founding members. The team participated in the Slovenian PrvaLiga, Slovenian Football Cup, and UEFA Europa League. The season covers the period from 1 June 2016 to 31 May 2017.

Slovenian League

Standings

Results summary

Results by round

Matches

Colour key: Green = Maribor win; Yellow = draw; Red = opponents win.

Notes

Slovenian Cup

Colour key: Green = Maribor win; Yellow = draw; Red = opponents win.

UEFA Europa League

Second qualifying round

Third qualifying round

Play-off round

Colour key: Green = Maribor win; Yellow = draw; Red = opponents win.

Notes

Friendlies

Colour key: Green = Maribor win; Yellow = draw; Red = opponents win.

Squad statistics

Key
Players

No.     = Shirt number
Pos.    = Playing position
GK      = Goalkeeper
DF      = Defender
MF      = Midfielder
FW      = Forward

Nationality

 = Bosnia and Herzegovina
 = Brazil
 = Croatia
 = France
 = Israel
 = Macedonia
 = Nigeria
 = Senegal
 = Serbia
 = Slovenia

Competitions

 = Appearances
 = Goals
 = Yellow card
 = Red card

Designations

Appearances and goals
Correct as of 27 May 2017, after the match against Krško. Flags indicate national team as has been defined under FIFA eligibility rules. Players may hold more than one non-FIFA nationality. Only the players, which made at least one appearance for the first team, are listed.

Discipline
Correct as of 27 May 2017, after the match against Krško. Flags indicate national team as has been defined under FIFA eligibility rules. Players may hold more than one non-FIFA nationality. If a player received two yellow cards in a match and was subsequently sent off, the numbers count as two yellow cards, one red card.

Foreign players
Below is the list of foreign players who have made appearances for the club during the 2016–17 season. Players primary citizenship is listed first.
EU Nationals

  Dejan Mezga
 Matko Obradović

EU Nationals (Dual citizenship)

  Rodrigo Defendi
  Marcos Tavares

Non-EU Nationals

 Amar Rahmanović
 Marwan Kabha
 Sintayehu Sallalich
 Sunny Omoregie

Transfers and loans

In

Out

Notes

Loans in

Loans out

See also
List of NK Maribor seasons

References

NK Maribor seasons
Maribor